Mallorcan soup (also spelled Majorcan;) or Mallorcan dry soup is a typical dish in the gastronomy of the island of Mallorca. It is a rustic dish, often closer in texture to a casserole or very thick stew. It typically is eaten with a fork rather than a spoon.

This dish appears in the Middle Ages. Its origin is peasant, probably from the villages of the Majorcan mountains (Serra de Tramuntana). Reflecting the harshness of rural life, it traditionally was made with whatever produce was available in the vegetable garden, primarily cabbage, spring onions, leeks and garlic, to which stale bread and vegetable stock were added. In rare cases, meat or wild mushrooms might be included. According to one source, it was prepared without pork by the Chuetas, those descendants of Jews forcibly converted during the Inquisition, who had lived on the island for centuries, and then spread among the rest of the Majorcan population.

The dish is eaten mainly in winter and is quite commonly found in village restaurants offering the island cuisine.

It is a thick soup, in appearance similar to a vegetable stew.

Ingredients and preparation 
The base of the Majorcan soup is the bread: thin, stale slices of a Majorcan brown bread made with buckwheat flour, . Bags of the thinly sliced stale bread are often sold by bakers for convenient  making.

Vegetables can include cabbage, cauliflower, tomatoes, onions, garlic, parsley. Other seasonal vegetables may be included. Meats may include pork or a local sausage, such as the spicy   or the camaiot. Spices include sweet paprika.

Influence 

Llorenç Villalonga i Pons described the dish in 1960 in his book Majorca:

Similar dishes 

Many Mediterranean cuisines include soups that feature day-old bread. There are also bread soups in other cuisines, such as Ollebrod in Danish cuisine, Tyurya in Russian cuisine, Wodzianka in Polish cuisine (Silesia and Central Poland), and Paomo in Chinese cuisine.

References 

European cuisine
Bread soups
Stews